Clarkia purpurea is a species of wildflower known by the common names winecup clarkia, winecup fairyfan, and purple clarkia.

This annual plant is native to western North America, including: Baja California; California; Arizona; Oregon; Washington; and British Columbia. — where it is found in a diverse variety of habitats. In the California Floristic Province it is found in all the zones, except the deserts, from the coasts to high interior mountains, including the Sierra Nevada.

Description 
Clarkia purpurea erects a thin reddish stem which may approach 1 meter (3 ft.) in height and has a few lance-shaped leaves.

The bowl-shaped flowers have four petals, usually one to two centimeters long. They are in shades of pink, purple, or deep wine red; often with a streak or spot of pink or red in the middle.

Subspecies 
Subspecies include:
Clarkia purpurea ssp. purpurea 
Clarkia purpurea ssp. quadrivulnera  
Clarkia purpurea ssp. viminea

Uses
The Indigenous peoples of California sowed the plant, to later harvest the seeds to grind for food.

The conspicuous flowers support native bees, making it a "honey plant".

Taxonomy
Clarkia purpurea was first described in 1796 as Oenothera purpurea in Curtis's Botanical Magazine. In 1918, it was redescribed by Aven Nelson and James Francis Macbride,  who allocated it to the genus Clarkia, as Clarkia purpurea.

References

External links
Jepson Manual Profile: Clarkia purpurea
Clarkia purpurea — U.C. Photo gallery

purpurea
Flora of Baja California
Flora of California
Flora of Arizona
Flora of Oregon
Flora of Washington (state)
Flora of British Columbia
Flora of the Sierra Nevada (United States)
Natural history of the California Coast Ranges
Natural history of the Peninsular Ranges
Natural history of the Santa Monica Mountains
Plants described in 1796
Plants used in Native American cuisine
Plants described in 1918
Flora without expected TNC conservation status